Jesus Colás Abad (born 1961) is a former professional tennis player from Spain.

Biography
Colás come from Las Palmas, the capital of Gran Canaria, in the Canary Islands.

A right-handed player, Colás won a doubles title on the Challenger circuit in Messina in 1985, with David de Miguel, who was a regular partner on tour.

He made one Grand Prix final, the doubles at Madrid in 1986, with de Miguel. In the final they were defeated by top seeds Anders Järryd and Joakim Nyström.

His only main draw appearance in a Grand Slam tournament came at the 1986 French Open, in the men's doubles with de Miguel. The Spaniards were unable to get past Jan Gunnarsson and Michael Mortensen in the first round.

Although more successful in doubles, Colás featured in the singles draws of several Grand Prix tournaments. He won matches at the Torneo Godó in Barcelona in 1988 and 1988 Geneva Open, both over countryman Alberto Tous.

Grand Prix career finals

Doubles: 1 (0–1)

Challenger titles

Doubles: (1)

References

External links
 
 

1961 births
Living people
Spanish male tennis players
Sportspeople from Las Palmas